Propionivibrio is a genus of gram-negative, chemoorganotrophic, non-spore-forming bacteria from the family of Rhodocyclaceae which belongs to the class of Betaproteobacteria.

References

Bacteria genera
Rhodocyclaceae